Lamington railway station served the village of Lamington, South Lanarkshire, Scotland from 1848 to 1965 on the Caledonian main line.

History 
The station opened on 15 February 1848 by the Caledonian Railway. To the northwest was the goods yard and north of the southbound platform was the signal box. The station closed on 4 January 1965.

References

External links 

Disused railway stations in South Lanarkshire
Former Caledonian Railway stations
Railway stations in Great Britain opened in 1848
Railway stations in Great Britain closed in 1965
1848 establishments in Scotland
1965 disestablishments in Scotland
Beeching closures in Scotland